Colwell Brickenden (1663 - 1714) was a Clergyman and Master of Pembroke College, Oxford.

Education
He was educated at John Roysse's Free School in Abingdon. (now Abingdon School) from 1675-1680. He earned a B.A (1684/5) and M.A (1687) at Pembroke.  B.D. & Doctor of Divinity (D.D.) 1710.

Career
He resided at Clawton Manor in 1690 where he was rector. Also rector of Inkpen and inherited the Titcomb Estate in Kintbury following the death of his elder brother. He rebuilt the rectory and built Inkpen House in c.1695. He obtained a prebend of Gloucester.

Brickenden became Master of Pembroke in 1710 after defeating a second candidate called William Hunt. The close relationship between Abingdon School and Pembroke College resulted in seven Old Abingdonians being appointed as consecutive masters at Pembroke between 1710 and 1843. They were Brickenden 1710-1714; Matthew Panting, 1714-1738; John Ratcliffe, 1738-1775; William Adams, 1775-1789; William Sergrove  1789-1796; John Smyth, 1796-1809 and George William Hall, 1809-1843.

Personal life
He had seven children, one of whom was Richard Brickenden.

See also
 List of Old Abingdonians
 List of Pembroke College, Oxford, people

References

1663 births
1714 deaths
Masters of Pembroke College, Oxford
People educated at Abingdon School